

The Boeing TB (or Model 63) was an American torpedo bomber biplane designed by the US Navy and built by Boeing in 1927.

Development and design
The TB was an improved version of the Martin T3M. It was constructed of all dural, with a fabric covering. The wheeled undercarriage was a conventional configuration that could be interchanged with floats. As a landplane, the main gear units carried twin wheels. The underside of the fuselage incorporated a glazed station for the bombardier.

Even before the three XTB-1s were delivered, the Navy's Bureau of Aeronautics had changed its opinion about what was needed in a torpedo bomber, and based on experience with the NAF XTN-1 had decided that a twin-engine aircraft would better suit the role. Having thus been made redundant, no TBs past the three prototypes were built.

Specifications

References

 
 
 

Boeing TB
TB
Single-engined tractor aircraft
Biplanes